Albert Severin Roche (1895–1939) was a distinguished French soldier, known for his numerous successful missions and capturing of enemy soldiers throughout the First World War.

Ferdinand Foch, the Supreme Allied Commander during World War One, said of Roche that he was "the first soldier of France".

Origins
Albert was born in Reauville in the department of Drôme in south-eastern France on the 5th of March 1895. He was the third son of a modest family of farmers. His father is Séverin Roche and his mother is Louise Savel.

First World War

Initial Rejection
In 1913, Albert was rejected by an assessment board of the French Army, because it considered him too puny to serve. This apparently delighted his father who stated, “We need arms to run the farm." In August 1914 Albert, however, wanted to fight and in opposition to his father took his bag and ran away.

Albert reported in another district at the Allan training camp, which assigned him to the 30th Battalion of Chasseurs. His military training did not go well, he was badly assessed and not respected. His temper finally got the better of him and he walked off the camp, whereupon he was immediately caught and arrested for desertion. His defence on these charges was that he was not a deserter and that "Bad soldiers are sent up there, but I want to go where we fight.”

Assigned to the Blue Devils
Albert was assigned on 3 July 1915 to the 27th Battalion of Chasseurs Alpins, engaged in Aisne, in today's Hauts-de-France region, a northern region of France. This battalion was nicknamed the "blue devils" by the Germans.

Assault on a German block house
Albert volunteered to destroy a German block house. Creeping up to the enemy's trenches, Albert noticed that the Germans were pressed against a stove in the block house for heat and threw a handful of grenades down the stove chimney. The position was neutralized with several deaths and the surrender of the survivors, believing that they had been attacked by a large force. Albert returned to his base with the captured machine guns and 8 prisoners.

Sudel Trench
In another instance, Albert found himself one day the only survivor of his position, a trench in Sudel in Alsace. He then positioned along the trench and used the weapons of his dead comrades, alternately firing them, making the enemy believe the resistance of the garrison was still resolute. The Germans eventually gave up this attack.

Captured and Interrogated
Albert volunteered regularly for reconnaissance missions, but on one occasion, he was captured with his wounded lieutenant. Isolated in a bunker during an interrogation, he managed to overwhelm and kill his interrogator, stealing his pistol. He returned to the French lines with 42 new prisoners while wearing his wounded lieutenant on his back.

Leopard crawl through no-man’s land
During the battle of the Chemin des Dames, Albert’s captain was seriously wounded and fell between the lines. Albert crawled under fire for six hours to reach him, and then another four hours to finally hand him over to stretcher-bearers. Exhausted, he fell asleep in a guard hole, but was awakened by a patrol that mistook him for sleeping on duty. Abandoning a post under fire, was punishable by being shot within 24 hours. In spite of his denials, Albert had no witnesses and he was sent to a detention barracks to await execution. Albert wrote to his father: "In an hour I shall be shot, but I assure you that I am innocent. “ As Albert was taken in front of a firing squad, a messenger arrived interrupting them: Albert’s captain had just awoken from his coma and brought his favorable testimony.

End of hostilities
By the end of World War One, Albert had been wounded nine times, and had personally captured 1,180 prisoners. At the end of the conflict, at 23, he was still a second class soldier. On November 27, 1918, on the balcony of the City Hall of Strasbourg, Albert was presented to General Foch in front of a huge crowd with these words: "Alsatians, I present to you your liberator Albert Roche. He is the first soldier of France! ". Shortly before, Foch had surprisingly discovered Albert's service record, exclaiming: "He has done all this, and he has no rank." Albert was killed in 1939 during a tragic accident involving a bus, where in Albert was killed upon impact with the vehicle. 

Albert's story is told in comic book form in Monsieur Le Chien and L'Odieux Connard, Le Petit théâtre des opérations (Éditions Audie-Fluide Glacial, 2021). Albert is also the subject of the song The First Soldier by Swedish power metal band Sabaton, from their EP Heroes of the Great War, released on 20th January 2023.

Honors

Legion of Honor
Albert was awarded the cross of the Legion of Honor from the commander of the Army of the Vosges, General de Maud'huy. He was also invited to dine with General Mangin.

 Albert also held twelve further citations, including four from the order of the Army.

Tomb of the Unknown Soldier
In 1920 he was one of 11 soldiers chosen to select the Unknown Soldier and with seven of his comrades, carried the coffin of the latter at the ceremony at the Arc de Triomphe.

Funeral of Lord French
Albert was a member of the French delegation to London in 1925 with General Gouraud to attend the funeral of Field Marshall Lord French. He and five representatives of the Army were also invited to dine with King George V.

Later life and death
Albert returned home to Valréas in the Vaucluse where he worked modestly as a municipal labourer, marrying a woman from Colonzelle in the neighboring Drôme. They had two daughters, Magali and Marie-Pierre.

Albert eventually became a firefighter in the powder magazine of Sorgues.

In April 1939, Albert was involved in an accident with a car on departing from a bus that took him to work. The car belonged to the former President of the Republic, Emile Loubet.  He was transferred to the Sainte-Marthe hospital in Avignon, where he died on 14 April (at "five o'clock" according to his death certificate) at the age of 44. As the historian Pierre Miquel writes in La Grande Guerre day-to-day, Editions Pluriel writes: "This man had gone through four years of war, he had been wounded nine times, he had been close to death a thousand times, Almost unjustly shot as a mutineer. He had escaped all dangers, all accidents. [...] All of this to be killed twenty years later, on his way home, on the descent of the bus. "

Honours
Édouard Daladier, the politician and prime minister of France requested that full military honors be given to him at his funeral. In 1971, the municipality of Réauville erected a cenotaph to his memory in front of his family house. Originally buried in Sorgues, the body of Albert Roche was transferred on September 22, 1967 to the cemetery Saint-Véran d'Avignon, where it still lies (square 40, row north, grave 15).

A stela in his memory was inaugurated in Réauville in 1971 by the Mayor of the time, Gabriel Jarniac.

In 2018 La Poste issues a stamp to the memory of Albert Roche.

In March 2019, an exhibition is dedicated to him at the Musée des troupes de montagne in Grenoble.

The song "The First Soldier" by Swedish heavy metal band Sabaton is about Albert Severin Roche's time in the Great War.

References

See also
 Chasseurs alpins

1895 births
1939 deaths
French military personnel of World War I
French Army soldiers
Officiers of the Légion d'honneur
Recipients of the Médaille militaire (France)
Recipients of the Croix de Guerre 1914–1918 (France)
Road incident deaths in France